Derviš Hadžiosmanović (Cyrillic: Дервиш Хаџиосмановић, born 9 August 1958) is a Montenegrin football coach and former player.

Playing career

Club
Born in Pljevlja, SR Montenegro, back then within Yugoslavia, he played as midfielder in the Yugoslav First League with FK Budućnost Titograd, and with Yugoslav Second League sides OFK Titograd, NK Čelik Zenica, FK Novi Pazar and NK Iskra Bugojno.

By September 2016, he was listed among the few former players considered legends of FK Rudar Pljevlja by club's official website. He started and finished his playing career at his home-town club Rudar. Before retiring he had a memorable season in which he, along Damir Čakar and Dragan Aničić formed a superb trio that drove Rudar to the promotion to the Second League of FR Yugoslavia.

Managerial career
As a manager, he spent over a decade managing clubs in Albania, most notably Vllaznia Shkodër. In February 2019, he was in charge of FK Mornar for only three days.

References

1959 births
Living people
Sportspeople from Pljevlja
Yugoslav footballers
Association football midfielders
FK Rudar Pljevlja players
FK Budućnost Podgorica players
OFK Titograd players
NK Čelik Zenica players
FK Novi Pazar players
NK Iskra Bugojno players
Yugoslav First League players
Yugoslav Second League players
Montenegrin football managers
KF Vllaznia Shkodër managers
KS Kastrioti managers
KF Tërbuni Pukë managers
FK Mornar managers
Montenegrin expatriate football managers
Expatriate football managers in Albania
Montenegrin expatriate sportspeople in Albania
Kategoria Superiore managers
Montenegrin Muslims